Antaly is a town and commune in southwestern Madagascar. It belongs to the district of Ampanihy, which is a part of Atsimo-Andrefana Region. The population of the commune was estimated to be approximately 9,000 in 2001 commune census.

Only primary schooling is available. The majority 60% of the population of the commune are farmers, while an additional 38% receives their livelihood from raising livestock. The most important crop is cassava, while other important products are sugarcane, sweet potatoes and rice.  Services provide employment for 2% of the population.

References and notes 

Populated places in Atsimo-Andrefana